Lara Owen is an academic at the University of St Andrews. She researches and writes about menstruation and culture and menstruation.

Owen has a PhD in Management & Organisation Studies from Monash University Business School in Melbourne. Her PhD investigated the uptake of menstrual workplace policies and menstrual cups.

In 1993, Owen published the book Her Blood Is Gold: Awakening to the Wisdom of Menstruation. It has since been translated and re-published several times.

References

External links 

Academics of the University of St Andrews
Living people
Year of birth missing (living people)
Monash University alumni
British women writers
Feminist bloggers
Australian women writers
Australian writers